Deoxycytidine is a deoxyribonucleoside, a component of deoxyribonucleic acid.  It is similar to the ribonucleoside cytidine, but with one hydroxyl group removed from the C2' position.

Deoxycytidine can be phosphorylated at C5' of the deoxyribose by deoxycytidine kinase, converting it to deoxycytidine monophosphate (dCMP), a DNA precursor. dCMP can be converted to dUMP and dTMP.

It can also be used as a precursor for 5-aza-2′-deoxycytidine, a treatment for MDS patients. This compound slows the cell cycle by interfering with the methylation of the P15/INK4B gene, increasing the expression of P15/INK4B protein which subdues the transformation of MDS to leukemia.

References 

Nucleosides
Pyrimidones
Hydroxymethyl compounds